Sur un air de déjà vu is a studio album released in 2008 by Québécois néo-trad band Les Cowboys Fringants. This album mainly features songs with a lighter tone as the band did on their first few albums.

Track listing
 "Chanteur pop" – 4:27
 "Beau-frère" – 3:05
 "La ballade de Jipi Labrosse" – 1:31
 "Sur un air de déjà vu" – 1:40
 "Par chez nous" – 3:23
 "Sans tambour ni trompette" – 0:26
 "Normal Tremblay" – 2:26
 "1994" – 3:45
 "Pittoresque !" – 2:15
 "Vacances 31" – 2:48
 "Le blues d'la vie" – 1:26
 "Titi Tancrède / Le reel d'la fesse" – 4:27
 "Rentre à pied" – 2:44
 "Quand tu pars" – 1:26
 "Au pays des sapins géants" – 3:52
 "Döner au suivant" – 1:14

Charts

References

2008 albums
Les Cowboys Fringants albums